Southeast Television (SETV) formerly Fujian Television, is a television network in Fujian, China. It is part of the Fujian Media Group, which in itself is part of the Fujian Radio Film and TV Group conglomerate. SETV currently broadcasts in Mandarin, Taiwanese, Hakka, Fuzhounese and Hokkien.

See also
Fujian Radio Film and TV Group

References

External links
Official Website

Television networks in China
Mass media in Fujian
Companies based in Fuzhou
1994 establishments in China
Television channels and stations established in 1994